Walt Cassidy, born in Los Alamitos, California, is a New York City-based artist, notable for his contemporary art and participation in the New York City Club Kids culture. His exploratory art and design emphasizes narrative abstraction, aestheticism, and conceptualism.

Walt Cassidy Studio (Design)

In 2014, Walt Cassidy Studio was established as a unisex brand encompassing jewelry, silkscreen printing and hand painted murals.

The jewelry gained attention through social media platforms, such as Instagram, and was discovered by Mark Holgate and profiled in Vogue in 2015.  

Walt Cassidy Studio created jewelry for Derek Lam's Spring Summer 2016 collection, and has collaborated with the Long Life China Company and the Brazilian brand Melissa. The design works have been featured at The Limited Edition (Miami), The Feathered (Mexico City) and Maison 10 (New York).

In 2016, Walt Cassidy Studio began a series of interior based murals for private collections, largely focused on atmospheric color storms and muscular flower motifs.  The murals extended to public spaces such as Leslie-Lohman Museum, The Pod Hotel and HOWM Restaurant at Selina Hotel in New York City.

Artworks

Cassidy's artwork evolved from an interest in still life photography, sculpture, and illustration. The Kitchen Spells (2005) and The Inferior Orbs (2006) were first exhibited in The Believers at MASS MOCA and operate symbolically on multiple levels, indicating religious spiritualism and secular cultural resonance, while also working as deep autobiographical portraits.

The Protective Motif, Cassidy's first solo show in New York, debuted in 2010 at Invisible-Exports gallery in Manhattan's Lower East Side. The show included The Paper Photographs (2008), ink drawings, and the wall based sculptures, Nail Bomb (2009) and Through (2010). Cassidy works in cut brass, weaving, stripping, and hooking abstract patterns and textures on a wood frames. These works are minimalist in material but maximalist in emotion, and operate where autobiography meets methodology.

The Nervous Peal (2011) drawings were exhibited in The Displaced Person at Invisible-Exports, alongside works by Sue Williams and Ron Athey. In this series of ink drawings of athletic sculptures, Cassidy examined structures that impose both conformity and alterity on the body. Carbon photography prints of idyllic male youths, framed within hand-drawn structures, reflect an eroticization of and dislocation from the male form. Tellingly, Cassidy's choice of settings includes New York's Jacob Riis beach, honoring a man who documented the blight of the industrial era's downtrodden.

"Waltpaper"

Throughout the 1990s, Walt Cassidy (then called Waltpaper, a reference to his early illustration work) was at the center of the New York City Club Kids, an artistic and fashion-conscious youth culture. The group was a definitive force in New York City's underground club culture at the time and made long-lasting contributions to mainstream art and fashion. According to Cassidy, "The nightclub for me was like a laboratory, a place where you were encouraged and rewarded for experimentation." He lived at the Chelsea Hotel during this time period.

Cassidy founded the band BOOB (1995–98), a conceptual hardcore rock band, composed of various club kids, that began amidst the infamous Peter Gatien-owned nightclubs—The Limelight, Tunnel, Palladium, and Club USA—as well as the downtown venues CBGB and Don Hills. The band was known for their elaborate and over-the-top image, which sought to challenge gender social norms during the growing conservatism of Rudy Giuliani's "Quality of Life" campaign in New York City.

In October 2019, Cassidy’s first book, NEW YORK: CLUB KIDS by Waltpaper, is published by Damiani.  A high-impact visual diary of New York City in the 1990s, NEW YORK: CLUB KIDS is a comprehensive visual document of the decade's colorful nightlife and street culture.  The book grants special access to an underground world, providing exclusive insight into the lifestyle of this celebrated and notorious clique. In New York Club Kids, Cassidy details the trajectory of the movement, illustrating his story with over 500 images by 18 photographers and artists who documented the scene. The images capture the driving members of the scene, as well as the thousands of other club-goers, along with the fashion, iconic clubland graphics, extravagant interiors of the mega-clubs they frequented, and the bustling city-scape of New York City in the 1990s. “There was a vast scene of people who were doing so many different things creatively,” says Cassidy. “The book is really a love story to New York, told from the vantage point of the Club Kids.”)

Exhibitions
2006 Gay Art Now, curated by Jack Pierson, Paul Kasmin Gallery, New York City
2007 The Believers, curated by Elizabeth Thomas and Nato Thompson, Massachusetts Museum of Contemporary Art, North Adams, MA
2008 Womanizer, curated by Kembra Pfahler, Deitch Projects, New York City
2010 The Protective Motif, Invisible-Exports Gallery, New York City
2010 Closed for Installation, 303 Gallery, New York City
2011 The Unseen, curated by Adela Leibowitz, Torrance Art Museum, California
2012 The Displaced Person, Invisible-Exports Gallery, New York City
2013 The Wishing Well, Galeria Melissa, New York City
2013 Drawing Down The Moon, curated by Andrew Suggs, VOX POPULI, Philadelphia
2013 ARTCORE, Galerie Melilli Manchinetti, Berlin
2014 Trip The Lights Fantastic, curated by Natalie Kates, High Line Gallery, New York City
2014 The Botanica, curated by AA Bronson and Michael Bühler-Rose, Invisible Exports, New York City
2015 Interface:  Queer Artists Forming Communities Through Social Media, curated by Walt Cessna, Leslie-Lohman Museum of Gay and Lesbian Art, New York City
2020 Things On Walls, curated by Benjamin Tischer / New Discretions, Affective Care, New York City
2022 The Dance Of The Plumeria, Mural Installation, Selina Hotel, New York City

References

External links
Invisible-Exports
Walt Cassidy on the Internet Movie Database

1972 births
Living people
Artists from California
Club Kids